Periploca atrata, the juniper cone moth, is a moth in the family Cosmopterigidae. It was described by Ronald W. Hodges in 1962. It is found in the United States, where it has been recorded from Arizona and California.

Adults have been recorded on wing from April to May and from July to August.

The larvae feed on the berries of Juniperus californica and Juniperus deppeana.

References

Moths described in 1962
Chrysopeleiinae
Taxa named by Ronald W. Hodges
Moths of North America